The Hans Sigrist Prize is awarded by the Hans Sigrist Foundation, at the University of Bern in Switzerland. The Foundation's benefactor Hans Sigrist died on December 30, 1982. The Foundation was founded in 1993. The Foundation's first award was presented in 1994.

The Hans Sigrist Prize is for mid-career researchers in order to boost those researcher's potential impact. Every year, the Foundation asks faculty members at the University of Bern to propose a prize field. The Foundation board chooses a field from those proposals and selects a chair for the prize search committee. Two former Hans Sigrist prize winners have gone on to win Nobel prizes later in their careers.

The Hans Sigrist Doctoral Fellowship is an up to three year Fellowship for doctoral candidates at the University of Bern. Its field changes with the field chosen for that year's Hans Sigrist Prize.

N Later won a Nobel Prize

References 

Swiss awards
Fellowships